The Tower of Tizzà is a Genoese tower located in the commune of Sartène on the west coast of the Corsica. The tower was one of a series of coastal defences constructed by the Republic of Genoa between 1530 and 1620 to stem the attacks by Barbary pirates.

In 1985 the tower was listed as one of the official historical monuments of France.

See also
List of Genoese towers in Corsica

References

Towers in Corsica
Monuments historiques of Corsica